Raymond John Barry (born March 14, 1939) is an American film, television, and stage actor. He was nominated for the Independent Spirit Award for Best Supporting Male for his performance in the film Steel City.

Personal life
Raymond John Barry was born in Hempstead, New York. He is married to writer Robyn Mundell. Together they have four children, Oona, Raymond, Liam and Manon.

His father, Raymond Barry, worked in sales. His mother, Barbara Constance Barry (née Duffy), was also an actor, known professionally as B. Constance Barry (April 29, 1913 – October 22, 2006). Her final role in 2001, after a career of small or cameo appearances in films, was in the film L.I.E., as Anne Harrigan, the mother of a Long Island pedophile. Barry's mother was of Canadian, Irish, and Swedish descent, and Barry's paternal grandparents were from Ireland.

Education

A three-letter athlete at Lynbrook High School in Lynbrook, New York, Barry graduated from Brown University in 1962. While there, he earned his degree in Philosophy. Afterwards, he completed the Yale Drama School.

Career

Before appearing in films he appeared in more than 75 plays. Barry is known for his roles in the film Interview with the Assassin, portraying Walter Ohlinger, a man who claimed to be the second shooter on the Grassy Knoll in the assassination of John F. Kennedy, and as Ron Kovic's father in the Academy Award-winning film Born on the Fourth of July. Barry also played Pa Cox in Walk Hard: The Dewey Cox Story, and is known for his character's continuous quote, "The wrong kid died!"

Other films in which he appeared include: Dead Man Walking, Cool Runnings, K2, The Tulse Luper Suitcases, Falling Down, and Training Day.

On television, he has appeared as Jack Shephard's grandfather in Lost, as Fox Mulder's congressional patron, Senator Richard Matheson, in The X-Files, and as Lilly Rush's father in CBS series Cold Case. He had a recurring role on Justified as Arlo Givens, the father of main character Raylan Givens.

Barry appeared in two films focusing on the death penalty, Dead Man Walking and The Chamber, with actor Robert Prosky.

Barry will next appear in the 2021  feature film Filthy Animals written and directed by James T. North IV and produced by Kendra Gage North and Elyusha Vafaeisefat.

Films

Television

Theatre 
Off Broadway

 Broadway

References

External links
 
 
 
 
 

1939 births
Living people
20th-century American male actors
21st-century American male actors
Male actors from New York (state)
American male film actors
American male stage actors
American male television actors
American people of Canadian descent
American people of Irish descent
American people of Swedish descent
Brown University alumni
People from Hempstead (village), New York
Yale School of Drama alumni
People from Lynbrook, New York
Lynbrook Senior High School alumni